Buitinga is a genus of African cellar spiders that was first described by B. A. Huber in 2003.

Species
 it contains twenty-two species, found only in Africa:
Buitinga amani Huber, 2003 – Tanzania
Buitinga asax Huber, 2003 – Tanzania
Buitinga batwa Huber & Warui, 2012 – Uganda
Buitinga buhoma Huber, 2003 – Uganda
Buitinga ensifera (Tullgren, 1910) – Tanzania
Buitinga globosa (Tullgren, 1910) – Tanzania
Buitinga griswoldi Huber, 2003 – Uganda
Buitinga kadogo Huber, 2003 (type) – Tanzania
Buitinga kanzuiri Huber, 2003 – Congo
Buitinga kihanga Huber, 2003 – Tanzania
Buitinga kikura Huber, 2003 – Congo
Buitinga lakilingo Huber, 2003 – Tanzania
Buitinga mazumbai Huber, 2003 – Tanzania
Buitinga mbomole Huber, 2003 – Kenya, Tanzania
Buitinga mulanje Huber, 2003 – Malawi
Buitinga nigrescens (Berland, 1920) – Kenya, Tanzania
Buitinga ruhiza Huber, 2003 – Uganda
Buitinga ruwenzori Huber, 2003 – Congo, Uganda
Buitinga safura Huber, 2003 – Tanzania
Buitinga tingatingai Huber, 2003 – Tanzania
Buitinga uzungwa Huber, 2003 – Tanzania
Buitinga wataita Huber & Warui, 2012 – Kenya

See also
 List of Pholcidae species

References

Araneomorphae genera
Pholcidae
Spiders of Africa